Vincenzo Pinton (14 March 1914 – 8 April 1980) was an Italian fencer. He won four silver medals at three Olympic Games.

References

1914 births
1980 deaths
Italian male fencers
Olympic fencers of Italy
Fencers at the 1936 Summer Olympics
Fencers at the 1948 Summer Olympics
Fencers at the 1952 Summer Olympics
Olympic silver medalists for Italy
Olympic medalists in fencing
Sportspeople from Vicenza
Medalists at the 1936 Summer Olympics
Medalists at the 1948 Summer Olympics
Medalists at the 1952 Summer Olympics